Louisiana's 34th State Senate district is one of 39 districts in the Louisiana State Senate. It has been represented by Democrat Katrina Jackson since 2020.

Geography
District 34 covers a majority-black swath of North Louisiana, including all of East Carroll, Madison Parishes, and Tensas Parishes, and parts of Concordia, Morehouse, Ouachita, Richland Parishes. The district covers some or all of the towns of Lake Providence, Tallulah, Ferriday, Delhi, Rayville, Bastrop, Monroe, and Richwood. 

The district is located entirely within Louisiana's 5th congressional district, and overlaps with the 14th, 16th, 17th, 19th, 20th, and 21st districts of the Louisiana House of Representatives.

Recent election results
Louisiana uses a jungle primary system. If no candidate receives 50% in the first round of voting, when all candidates appear on the same ballot regardless of party, the top-two finishers advance to a runoff election.

2019

2015

2011

Federal and statewide results in District 34

References

Louisiana State Senate districts
Concordia Parish, Louisiana
East Carroll Parish, Louisiana
Madison Parish, Louisiana
Morehouse Parish, Louisiana
Ouachita Parish, Louisiana
Richland Parish, Louisiana
Tensas Parish, Louisiana